Alopoglossus bicolor, Werner's largescale lizard, is a species of lizard in the family Alopoglossidae. It is endemic to Colombia.

References

Alopoglossus
Reptiles of Colombia
Endemic fauna of Colombia
Reptiles described in 1916
Taxa named by Franz Werner
Taxobox binomials not recognized by IUCN